Pseudolagarobasidium is a genus of nine species of crust fungi in the family Phanerochaetaceae. It was circumscribed in 1985. The type species, P. leguminicola, is associated with stem and root rot of the mimosoid tree Leucaena  leucocephala. Pseudolagarobasidium species grow on wood, and may be saprobes, endophytes, or parasites.

Species
Pseudolagarobasidium acaciicola Ginns (2006) – South Africa
Pseudolagarobasidium belizense Nakasone & D.L.Lindner (2012)
Pseudolagarobasidium calcareum (Cooke & Massee) Sheng H.Wu (1990)
Pseudolagarobasidium conspicuum (Pouzar) Nakasone (2015)
Pseudolagarobasidium leguminicola J.C.Jang & T.Chen (1985)
Pseudolagarobasidium modestum (Berk. ex Cooke) Nakasone & D.L.Lindner (2012)
Pseudolagarobasidium pronum (Berk. & Broome) Nakasone & D.L.Lindner (2012)
Pseudolagarobasidium pusillum Nakasone & D.L.Lindner (2012)
Pseudolagarobasidium venustum (Hjortstam & Ryvarden) Nakasone & D.L.Lindner (2012)

References

Phanerochaetaceae
Polyporales genera
Fungi described in 1985